Haji Javad Mosque is a mosque located in Baku, Azerbaijan in Yasamal District.

History 
The previous building of mosque had three inscriptions which state that the building was built in 1305 according to the Muslim calendar. The initiator of mosque building was the merchant Haji Javad. The building also had a place for Islamic religion school-madrasa.

During the Soviet era the mosque building was converted into a kindergarten and living areas. After the USSR, the collapsed mosque was repaired and opened for believers.

In April 2017, the demolition of the mosque caused unrest among the locals and sparked protests. Later in the year, per a presidential decree, a mosque of the same name was built on Abbas Mirza Sharifzade Street.

New building 
The new building was completed on April 12, 2018. Walls are decorated with ornaments and verses from the Quran.

See also
 Islam in Azerbaijan
 List of mosques in Azerbaijan

References 

Mosques in Baku